Sandeep Kumar (born 1 April 1983 in lakhan kalan, Punjab, India) is an amateur Indian-born Australian freestyle wrestler, who played for the men's light heavyweight category. Kumar moved to Melbourne, Australia permanently in 2004 to pursue more opportunities in the sport of wrestling, and officially granted a citizenship three years later. He also worked as a taxi driver in order to raise funds for his trip to the 2008 Summer Olympics in Beijing. Kumar is the brother of Anil Kumar, who competed in the same discipline at the 1992 Summer Olympics in Barcelona, Spain.

Kumar represented Australia at the 2008 Summer Olympics in Beijing, where he competed for the men's 84 kg class. He received a bye for the preliminary round of sixteen, before losing out to Tajikistan's Yusup Abdusalomov, who was able to score eight points in two straight periods, leaving Kumar without a single point. Because his opponent advanced further into the final match, Kumar offered another shot for the bronze medal by entering the repechage bouts. Unfortunately, he was defeated in the first round by Ukraine's Taras Danko, with a two-set technical score (0–3, 0–6), and a classification point score of 0–3.

References

External links
Profile – Australian Olympic Team
Profile – International Wrestling Database
NBC 2008 Olympics profile

Australian male sport wrestlers
1983 births
Living people
Olympic wrestlers of Australia
Wrestlers at the 2008 Summer Olympics
 from Punjab, India
Indian emigrants to Australia
Australian taxi drivers
Indian taxi drivers